Kőszegdoroszló (German: Deutschdorf) is a village in Vas county, Hungary.  The village has a thriving tourist trade.

References

Populated places in Vas County